Yoel Marcus (5 February 1932 – 23 February 2022) was an Israeli journalist and political commentator.

Biography
Marcus was born in Istanbul on 5 February 1932. At the age of eleven, he immigrated to Mandatory Palestine alone with Youth Aliyah. He was sent to the youth village at Kibbutz Yagur, near Haifa. 

Marcus died on 23 February 2022, shortly after his 90th birthday.

Journalism career
Marcus was a commentator for the Israeli newspaper Haaretz. He believed in brevity, no more than 600 words per column, and divided his columns into numbered "comments."  In 2007, he won a lifetime achievement award at the Eilat journalism conference.  In 2017, he won the Sokolov Prize for journalism.

References

1932 births
2022 deaths
Israeli opinion journalists
Turkish emigrants to Mandatory Palestine
Haaretz people